Vilnis ('Wave') was a Lithuanian language communist newspaper published from Chicago, the United States 1920–1989. The first issue was published on April 8, 1920, following the split the Socialist Party of America. The founder of Vilnis, Vincas Andrulis, became its editor.

Vilnis was a daily newspaper, but which became a weekly in its later years.  Vilnis was issued by the Workers Publishing Association. By the mid-1920s Vilnis had a circulation of around 11,500.

When the New York-based publication Daily Worker as suspended in the 1950s, Vilnis became the most widely circulated communist daily in the country. It had a circulation of around 32,000. As of 1968 Vilnis was a semi-weekly, with a circulation of 5,000. By the mid-1970s, the circulation of Vilnis (published thrice weekly) had dropped to 2,500. The association that published Vilnis later became the Workers Education Society.

See also 
Naujienos (socialist newspaper)
Non-English press of the Communist Party USA

References

Defunct newspapers published in Chicago
Lithuanian-language newspapers published in the United States
Communist periodicals published in the United States
Newspapers established in 1920
Publications disestablished in 1989